The 2002 Arab Cup was the eighth edition of the Arab Cup football competition, hosted in the nation of Kuwait. Saudi Arabia, who were the defending champions from the last Arab Cup, again won the title for a 2nd time at the conclusion of the competition.

Participated teams
10 teams participated in the tournament.  Morocco was represented by their U-23 team.

{| class="wikitable"
|-
!colspan=2|Participants 
|-
!Zone
!Team
|-
|rowspan=1|Hosts
|
|-
|rowspan=1|Holders
|
|-
|rowspan=1|Zone 1 (Gulf Area)
|
|-
|rowspan=2|Zone 2 (Red Sea)
|
|-
|
|-
|rowspan=1|Zone 3 (North Africa)
|
|-
|rowspan=4|Zone 4 (East Region)
|
|-
|
|-
|
|-
|

Squads

Venues

Group stage

Group A

Group B

Knock-out stage

Semi-finals

Final

In the semi-final, Saudi Arabia beat Morocco and Bahrain beat Jordan and met for a second time in the final.

The final match took place on 30 December 2002, at the Al Kuwait Sports Club Stadium in Kuwait City.  It determined the winner of the 2002 Arab Cup.  Saudi Arabia defeated Bahrain 1–0 after extra time to win their second consecutive Arab Cup.

Winners
It is the second consecutive title for Saudi Arabia after winning the title of the last session in Doha at the expense of Qatar 3–1 in 1998, noting that it was entering the final for the third time after its 1992 loss to Egypt 2–3 in the Syrian city of Aleppo.

Awards
 Clean playing team: 
 Fairplay team:

Final ranking

References

External links
 Arabian Cup 2002 Kuwait - RSSSF
 Arab Cup 2002 - Goalzz.com

2002 Arab Cup
Arab Cup, 2002
International association football competitions hosted by Kuwait
Arab
Arab
December 2002 sports events in Asia